Give a Monkey a Brain and He'll Swear He's the Center of the Universe is the fourth studio album by American rock band Fishbone. It was the last album to feature all six original members, as guitarist Kendall Jones left the band a few months after the album's release, and keyboardist/trombonist Chris Dowd would leave the next year.

It is Fishbone's heaviest album, with the band focusing on heavy metal without any trace of their trademark horn section until the fourth song, the ska-infused "Unyielding Conditioning".  Saxophonist Branford Marsalis makes an appearance on the manic "Drunk Skitzo", and the ending of "Swim" includes excerpts of a Damon Wayans stand-up routine about his experience at a Fishbone concert.

Shortly after the release of the album, the band toured as part of the third annual Lollapalooza festival, but was dropped by Sony Records the following year.

The title is a quotation from the discordian religious text Principia Discordia.

Track listing

Personnel
Angelo Moore – saxophone, vocals
Walter A. Kibby II – trumpet, vocals
Kendall Jones – lead guitar, vocals
Chris Dowd – keyboards, trombone, vocals
John Bigham – guitar, keyboards
John Norwood Fisher – bass, vocals
Philip "Fish" Fisher – drums
Kristen Vigard – background vocals

Accolades

Charts
Album - Billboard (North America)

References

Fishbone albums
1993 albums
Albums produced by Terry Date
Columbia Records albums